Wayne J. Molis (April 17, 1943 – March 24, 2002) was an American professional basketball player. A center/forward, he played professional basketball for only two seasons due to knee injury, which ended his career.

Personal life
Molis worked as a firefighter for eight years after his career ended.

References 

1943 births
2002 deaths
American men's basketball players
Centers (basketball)
Chicago State Cougars men's basketball players
Houston Mavericks players
Lewis Flyers men's basketball players
New York Knicks draft picks
New York Knicks players
Basketball players from Chicago